The Battle of Río Burbia or the Battle of the Burbia River was a battle fought in the year 791 between the troops of the Kingdom of Asturias, commanded by King Bermudo I of Asturias, and the troops of the Emirate of Córdoba, led by Yusuf ibn Bujt. The battle occurred in the context of the Ghazws of Hisham I against the Christian rebels of the northern Iberian Peninsula. The battle took place near the Río Burbia, in the area which is today known as Villafranca del Bierzo. The battle resulted in a victory for the Emirate of Cordoba.

The battle
The Emir, in his attempt to annex the Kingdom of Asturias, organized two armies for the purpose of enforcing this annexation. The first army was tasked with conquering Galicia, and the second with conquering western Basque lands. When Hisham I was returning to Córdoban territory with the spoils of his conquests, the Asturian army attacked. The Cordoban army, under the competent leadership of general Yusuf ibn Bujt, were able to successfully repel the attack and to further turn the ambush into a victory.

Consequences 
The retreat of the Asturian army provoked the abdication of King Bermudo in favor of Alfonso II of Asturias, son of King Fruela I of Asturias, grandson of Alfonso I of Asturias, and great-grandson of Pelagius of Asturias. Alfonso's first move as the new king would be to move the capital to Ovetao or Oviedo. He was crowned according to the rights of the old Visigothic kings in Toledo on September 14, 791.

Bermudo returned to his old clerical lifestyle in the same year, dying in the year 797. He would be remembered as a generous, magnanimous, and illustrious king.

Bibliography

See also 
 Bermudo I of Asturias
 Reconquista

the Burbia River
Burbia River
Burbia River
Burbia River
791
8th century in Al-Andalus